AnimeCon (Netherlands) is a yearly Dutch anime convention. The festival is officially called Anime  but is called AnimeCon by visitors.
AnimeCon is a non-profit organization organized by the J-POP Foundation.

AnimeCon is a 52-hour non-stop fan convention; featuring Japanese movies (animation and  cinematic), video games, competitions, concerts, theatre performances, workshops, presentations and the selling of art and merchandise. The doors open early in the afternoon on Friday and stay open until the end of the afternoon on Sunday.

AnimeCon is a fan convention for people who enjoy the elements of Japanese common popular culture and who want to find out more. AnimeCon is the largest Japan-oriented fan convention in the Netherlands, with just over 15.000 visitors in 2018.

International Cosplay competitions
There are six renowned international competitions in the cosplay scene, and the AnimeCon organization is the only one in the world hosting preliminaries for all of them. Also they hosted their own international competition for the second time in 2016: Clara Cow's Cosplay Cup is now the seventh international cosplay competition. 
 World Cosplay Summit, WCS (attendance not measured), Nagoya, Japan, for pairs
 CICAF, China International Cartoon and Animation Festival (attendance 2.000.000), Hangzhou, China, for teams from the Benelux
 Yamato Cosplay Cup, Anime Friends Festival (attendance 150.000), São Paulo,. Brazil, for individuals from the Benelux
 Euro Cosplay Championships, MCM London Comic Con (attendance 120.000), London, UK, for individuals
 ECG (European Cosplay Gathering), Japan Expo (attendance 250.000), Paris, France, for pairs and individuals
 Cosplay World Master, Iber Anime (attendance 25.000), Porto, Portugal
 Clara Cow's Cosplay Cup (C4), AnimeCon (projected attendance 15.000), The Hague, The Netherlands, for pairs

Clara Cow’s Cosplay Cup
This international cosplay event started in 2015 is named after the mascot Clara Cow. In Clara Cow's Cosplay Cup, or C4, teams of two cosplayers from different countries compete for the Golden Marieke statue and a week long all expenses paid trip to Japan. C4 is a relaxed event: the World Forum Theatre offers ample space backstage to relax, top notch facilities, a hotel on top of the venue, and all judging is done by veteran cosplayers from non-competing countries.
UK: MCM London Comic Con since 2001, attendance: 120.000
Spain: Salon del Manga since 1991, attendance: 130.000
France: Mang’Azur, attendance: 20.000
Germany: Animuc, attendance: 20.000
The Netherlands: AnimeCon since 1999, attendance 15.000
Poland: Japanicon since 2009, attendance: 10.000
Denmark: J-Popcon since 2000, attendance: 7.000
Romania: Otaku Festival since 2001, attendance: Not measured
Portugal: Iber Anime, attendance: 25.000
Switzerland: Japanimanga Night since 2001, Attendance: Not measured
Russia: Hinode Moscow, attendance: 80.000
USA: Omni Expo, attendance: 40.000
Belgium: F.A.C.T.S, attendance: 40.000

History

References 

 Anigenda website

External links
 Oficial  website

Anime conventions
Entertainment events in the Netherlands
Recurring events established in 1999
1999 establishments in the Netherlands
Annual events in the Netherlands